is a Japanese manga artist and illustrator. While working as a dōjin artist, she was in charge of the key drawings for the adult game Heart de Network (Euphony Production) in 2000. After releasing several one-shots in commercial magazines, she began serializing two manga (written by Ryukishi07) based on the Higurashi When They Cry visual novel series, Onisarashi-hen and Utsutsukowashi-hen, in Comp Ace (Kadokawa Shoten) from 2005 to 2007. In the July 2008 issue of Comp Ace, she started work on a manga based on Valkyria Chronicles, and completed the series in the May 2010 issue. She is a big fan of the Breath of Fire (Capcom) series of role-playing games, and her dōjin activities mainly revolve around it. Since the summer of 2010, she has been publishing her original dōjin work, the Saint Foire Festival series.

External links
 

Pixiv account

Manga artists
Living people
Year of birth missing (living people)